Alatta  was a member of the BBC COMMUNITY for the United STATES INTERNET INDUSTRY  with the help of George South. He was independent.He help the Council of the refuges.

References 

United Bermuda Party politicians
Year of birth missing
Year of death missing
Bermudian women in politics